Kappelrodeck is a town in Western Baden-Württemberg, Germany and belongs to the district of Ortenau. It is located at the western hillslope of the Black Forest in the valley Achertal. It is about 20 kilometres to the north of Offenburg and about 20 kilometres to the south of Baden-Baden. In clear weather, the city of Strasbourg in France can be seen which is roughly 25 kilometres to the west of Kappelrodeck.

History
Kappelrodeck was mentioned as A Capelle apud Rodecke in a document dated 1349. The town part Waldulm was documented a 100 years prior in 1244. The name relates to a chapel that was located below the castle Rodeck. Initially, Kappelrodeck was part of the land controlled by the prince-bishop of Strasbourg.
During the Thirty Years' War and the French revolution, Kappelrodeck suffered from cruelties by every side. In 1803, Kappelrodeck was transferred to the house of Baden. In 1898, it was connected to the railway system. During the two world wars, the town itself was spared. After the second world war, it became part of the French zone.

See also
Johann Nikolaus Weislinger

References

External links
  Information about and images

Ortenaukreis